The Emigrants is a 1971 Swedish film directed and co-written by Jan Troell and starring Max von Sydow, Liv Ullmann, Eddie Axberg, Allan Edwall, Monica Zetterlund, and Pierre Lindstedt. It and its 1972 sequel, The New Land (Nybyggarna), which were produced concurrently, are based on Vilhelm Moberg's The Emigrants, a series of novels about poor Swedes who emigrate from Småland, Sweden, in the mid-19th century and make their home in Minnesota. This film adapts the first two of the four novels (The Emigrants (1949) and Unto a Good Land (1952)), which depict the hardships the emigrants experience in Sweden and on their journey to America.

The Emigrants won international acclaim and was nominated for the Academy Award for Best Foreign Language Film at the 44th Academy Awards. It was nominated for four more Oscars the following year, including for Best Picture, the same year that The New Land was nominated for Best Foreign Language Film. The 1974 American television series The New Land is loosely based on both The Emigrants and its sequel.

Plot
In 1844, the Nilsson family lives on a small farm in the woods at Korpamoen in Ljuder Parish in the Swedish province of Småland. The eldest son, Karl Oskar, takes charge of the farm after his father, Nils, is injured when moving a large rock. Karl Oskar marries Kristina Johansdotter, and she moves to Korpamoen to live with him and his parents. In the following years, Karl Oskar and Kristina start a family, starting with Anna, who is followed by Johan, Marta and Harald. The family struggles with rock filled fields, poor weather, and bad harvests, leaving them hungry and in debt. Kristina rebukes Karl Oskar for his irreligious attitude, which she thinks is the cause of some of their troubles.

Karl Oskar's daydreaming and bookish younger brother, Robert, tired of being overworked and regularly beaten as an indentured farmhand at Aron's farm, reads about how wonderful life is in America and decides he is going to emigrate. He asks Arvid, his friend and fellow farmhand, to come with him, and Arvid eagerly agrees, but the pair's hopes are dashed when they realize they can not afford their passage. Robert confronts Karl Oskar about selling his share of the family farm, only to find that Karl Oskar has also privately been considering the idea of going to America. Kristina is unenthusiastic about the move, despite the potential for a better life, because she does not want to leave her homeland and has concerns about the arduous journey that would be required. However, when Anna dies after gorging herself on uncooked porridge, which expands and damages her stomach, Kristina, devastated by the loss, agrees to Karl Oskar's plan and they begin making preparations to leave Sweden.

Meanwhile, Danjel Andreasson, Kristina's uncle, is being persecuted by Brusander, the local provost, for rejecting the official religion and holding fundamentalist religious services in his home. He and his wife, Inga-Lena, and four young children are sentenced to exile, so he decides to join Karl Oskar in his move to America. Ulrika of Västergöhl, a former prostitute who is one of Danjel's followers, and her illegitimate sixteen-year-old daughter, Elin, also decide to come along, and Jonas Petter, a friend and neighbor of Karl Oskar, expresses an interest in making the trip to escape his unhappy marriage. Robert is even able to persuade Danjel to hire Arvid and pay his fare. The night before the departure, Kristina reveals to Karl Oskar that she is pregnant.

The party of emigrants travels south to the port city of Karlshamn, where they board the wooden brig Charlotta, which is bound for New York City. On board, Karl Oskar and Kristina meet Måns and Fina-Kajsa Andersson, an elderly couple heading for the Minnesota Territory, where they plan to settle on their son Anders' farm near a town called Taylor's Falls. After hearing how good the land is there, Karl Oskar and Kristina decide to follow them. During the voyage, Inga-Lena and Måns Andersson die of unrelated sudden illnesses, and Kristina nearly dies from a severe nosebleed.

Upon their arrival in New York, Karl Oskar and his party, along with Fina-Kajsa, begin the long journey westward to Minnesota, first by train, and then by riverboat. Throughout the whole journey from Sweden, the pious Kristina has been prejudiced against Ulrika for her past immorality, but they reconcile after Ulrika finds one of Kristina's children, who had gone missing at a riverboat stop and was almost left behind. Not long after this, while still on the riverboat, Danjel's infant daughter dies after a brief illness.

After finally arriving at the town of Stillwater, the party, with the help of Pastor Jackson, a friendly Baptist minister, finds their way to Anders' farm in what is now known as the Chisago Lakes area. He just lives in a wooden shack, but the land is fertile, and Danjel and Jonas Petter choose fine tracts of farmland nearby. Karl Oskar, however, heads deep into the woods to explore the lands along the shore of Lake Ki Chi Saga that he hears are even better. Upon his arrival, he finds the topsoil to be of excellent quality and stakes a claim to the land for himself and Kristina and their family by carving his name into a tree overlooking the lake.

Cast

Production

Development
Plans for adapting The Emigrants novels began late in 1967. Its author, Vilhelm Moberg, had seen Jan Troell's film Here Is Your Life before producer Bengt Forslund approached him about an Emigrants film. SF Studios wished to adapt all four novels, although it was uncertain how such a film structure would work.

Moberg requested Forslund and Troell meet him, and the three men mapped out a plot, with 98 scenes, finishing in March 1968. They also envisioned Max von Sydow, Liv Ullmann and Eddie Axberg as the ideal stars. Troell and Forslund went location scouting in the United States in September 1968, but found many of the lands were too developed or could not accommodate film equipment.

Filming

The scenes set in Chisago Lakes were actually filmed at Lake Krageholm in Scania, Sweden. Filming took place from June 1969 to January 1970, and then from May to August 1970.

Ullmann said that for The Emigrants and The New Land, which were shot at the same time, the actors had to learn historic methods of laundry, and also that the brief scene in The Emigrants where she is on a swing took two days to film.

The film employed 20 actors and 500 extras. The combined cost of the two films was kr 7 million, making them, at the time, the most expensive Swedish film yet produced.

Release
The Emigrants was released to cinemas in Sweden on 8 March 1971. It opened in New York City on 24 September 1972. The version released in the U.S. was cut from 190 to 150 minutes by Warner Bros., who distributed the film in America.

In the U.S., the film was not released on home video until February 2016, when The Criterion Collection released it, along with The New Land, on DVD and Blu-ray. The films had been frequently requested by customers. In 2016, The Emigrants was also featured in the Gothenburg Film Festival.

Reception

Critical reception
The film received mostly positive reviews. Roger Ebert gave it four stars, praising it as a "masterpiece", "infinitely absorbing and moving", and likely more accurate than traditional stories about immigration to the United States. Richard Schickel wrote in Life that "Jan Troell has made the masterpiece about the dream that shaped America - a dream, and an America, fast disappearing from our views". Vincent Canby of The New York Times hailed the acting performances, especially from von Sydow and Ullmann, which he found to hold "a kind of spontaneous truth, in look and gesture, that does a lot to relieve the otherwise programed nobility, truth and beauty". However, Canby criticized Troell for excessive views of "sunlight-reflected-in-water that becomes just one too many, a thing of movie decoration". In New York, Judith Crist praised the film as "exquisite", and wrote that the depiction of history "throbs with flesh and blood". In 5001 Nights at the Movies, Pauline Kael declared the film is "A bursting, resonant work".

In his 2015 Movie Guide, Leonard Maltin gave the film three stars, calling it "Solid if rambling". Dave Kehr recalled it as overrated, calling it "Uncommitted, tedious, and often dishonest". In 2016, the Swedish journal Sydsvenskan recalled The Emigrants as a classic.

Accolades
The Emigrants was nominated for five Academy Awards, including for both Best Foreign Language Film and Best Picture. However, the Academy's rules for eligibility for specific awards meant the nominations occurred in two separate years. It was the third film not in English to be nominated for Best Picture in the history of the Academy.

Legacy

The sequel, The New Land (Nybyggarna), was released in 1972. The 1974 U.S. television series The New Land is based loosely on both The Emigrants and its sequel. The creation of the TV series can be attributed to the popularity of the films. In Sweden, the musical Kristina från Duvemåla by Björn Ulvaeus and Benny Andersson, formerly of ABBA fame, was designed partly in reaction to Troell's films, particularly in differences in the set. Troell also gave his approval to Daniel Espinosa to make a new Emigrants film adaptation in 2015.

The two films were considered to give Jan Troell his "international breakthrough". They led to his receiving, and accepting, an offer from Warner Bros. to make Zandy's Bride, one of the first times a prominent Swedish director moved to Hollywood since the 1920s.

See also
List of submissions to the 44th Academy Awards for Best Foreign Language Film
List of Swedish submissions for the Academy Award for Best Foreign Language Film
List of foreign-language films nominated for Academy Awards

References

Bibliography

External links

The Emigrants/The New Land: Homelands an essay by Terrence Rafferty at the Criterion Collection

1971 films
1971 drama films
Swedish historical drama films
Swedish migration to North America
1970s Swedish-language films
Films based on Swedish novels
Films based on works by Vilhelm Moberg
Films featuring a Best Drama Actress Golden Globe-winning performance
Best Film Guldbagge Award winners
Films directed by Jan Troell
Films set in the 1840s
Films set in Minnesota
Films about immigration to the United States
Films set in the Atlantic Ocean
Films set in Småland
Works about Swedish-American culture
Best Foreign Language Film Golden Globe winners
Films based on multiple works of a series
Films scored by Erik Nordgren
1970s Swedish films
Foreign films set in the United States